"Around the World" is the second and final single from Dutch singer Natalie La Rose. It features American rapper Fetty Wap, who co-wrote the song with its producers Marco "MAG" Borrero, Ilya Salmanzadeh, and Max Martin, with additional writing from Savan Kotecha, Rickard Goransson, and DJ Frank E. The single reached number 3 on the US Billboard Bubbling Under Hot 100 Singles chart.

Music video 
The music video was released on July 24, 2015 on La Rose's Vevo account.

Charts

References

External links
 
 

2015 singles
Fetty Wap songs
2015 songs
Universal Republic Records singles
Songs written by Max Martin
Songs written by Savan Kotecha
Songs written by Ilya Salmanzadeh
Song recordings produced by Ilya Salmanzadeh
Song recordings produced by Max Martin
Music videos directed by Hannah Lux Davis
Songs written by Fetty Wap
Songs written by DJ Frank E
Songs written by Rickard Göransson
Natalie La Rose songs